The list of ship launches in the 1620s includes a chronological list of some ships launched from 1620 to 1629.


References

1627
Ships
1620s in transport
1620s ships